Prince Raphi Phatthanasak, Prince of Ratchaburi, (21 October 18747 August 1920) was a son of king Chulalongkorn and Chao Chom manda Talab. He had one full sister, Princess Ajrabarni Rajkanya.

A key figure in Thai legal reform, he graduated from Faculty of Law, University of Oxford. In 1892, the Ministry of Justice was established and Prince Raphi was appointed as Head Minister to unify the judiciary. In 1897, he set up the first law school in Thailand. He also reorganized the Thai court system under the 1908 Law on Organization. During his tenure as the Minister of Justice, his attempts to increase the independence of the Thai judiciary from the executive led to tensions with the king's absolutist outlook. This would eventually culminate in his resignation in 1910, precipitated by a legal dispute with Prince Narathip Praphanphong over Narathip's play Phraya Raka. Following their mentor, 28 senior judges also resigned from the judiciary in a show of loyalty, though all but one were summoned by the king to resume their position. Prince Raphi would later return to the bureaucracy in the reign of King Vajiravudh, serving as the Minister of Agriculture.

Prince Raphi died in Paris on 7 August 1920 at 21:00. He died of prostate cancer and kidney complications at the age of 45 years, 9 months, 17 days. King Rama VI asked the Siamese ambassador to France to organize a royal cremation ceremony in Paris, in accordance with  Prince Raphi's wishes. After that, Prince Kaiseang-raphi Rabhibhat came to pick up and summon the Royal Regiment of Prince Raphi Phatthanasak to Thailand on 1 December 1920.

Ancestry

References

1874 births
1920 deaths
19th-century Thai people
Thai male Phra Ong Chao
Chakri dynasty
Children of Chulalongkorn
Ministers of Justice of Thailand
Ministers of Agriculture and Cooperatives of Thailand
Members of the Privy Council of Thailand
19th-century Chakri dynasty
20th-century Chakri dynasty
Sons of kings